Budai was a Chinese monk who is often identified with and venerated as Maitreya Buddha in Chan Buddhism. With the spread of Chan Buddhism, he also came to be venerated in Vietnam, Korea, and Japan. He is said to have lived around the 10th century CE in the Wuyue kingdom. His name literally means "cloth sack", and refers to the bag that he is conventionally depicted as carrying as he wanders aimlessly. His jolly nature, humorous personality, and eccentric lifestyle distinguish him from most Buddhist masters or figures. He is almost always shown smiling or laughing, hence his nickname in Chinese, the "Laughing Buddha". As he is traditionally depicted as overweight and many stories surrounding Budai involve his love of food and drink,  he is also referred to as the "Fat Buddha", especially in the Western world.

The main textual evidence pointing to Budai resides in a collection of Chan Buddhist monks' biographies known as The Transmission of the Lamp.

Hagiography
Budai has origins centered around cult worship and local legend. He is traditionally depicted as a fat, bald monk wearing a simple robe. He carries his few possessions in a cloth sack, being poor but content. He would excitingly entertain the adoring children that followed him and was known for patting his large belly happily. His figure appears throughout Chinese culture as a representation of both contentment and abundance. Budai attracted the townspeople around him as he was able to predict people's fortunes and even weather patterns. The wandering monk was often inclined to sleep anywhere he came to, even outside, for his mystical powers could ward off the bitter colds of snow and his body was left unaffected. A recovered death note dated to 916 or 917 CE, which the monk himself wrote, claims that he is an incarnation of Maitreya, the Buddha of the Future. A body allegedly belonging to Budai was embalmed and displayed at the eastern section of the Great Hall at Yuelin Temple in Fenghua District, Zhejiang.

An account exists of the post mortem appearances of Budai, the Laughing Buddha, recorded in the Ching-te ch'uan-teng-lu (The Transmission of the Lamp), written between 1004 and 1007 CE by the monk Shi Daoyuan.

"In the third month of the third year of Cheng Ming (917 CE), the Master proclaimed his approaching parinirvana. At the Yueh-lin Temple, he took up his seat, cross legged, on a flat stone below the Eastern veranda, and spoke the following verse":

"Maitreya, the Veritable Maitreya, divides his body into ten thousand million parts. From time to time, appearing among men, he proclaims the Truth to the men of that era, but they naturally do not recognise him."

When he had finished reciting this verse, he quietly died. Afterwards, there were men in his neighbourhood who saw the Master, carrying his bag as before and walking. Because of this, the monks vied with one another in painting his likeness. Now in the Yueh-lin Temple, in the Eastern part of the Great Hall, is preserved his body (embalmed), and people in many places speak of his re-apparition as a proven fact.

Role in Chan Buddhist Pantheon
Budai was one of several "uncommitted saints" that became incorporated into the Chan pantheon.  Similar "eccentric" figures from the lamp histories were never officially inducted or appropriated into the Chan patriarchal line. Instead, these obscure figures represented the "special transmission" that occurred during the early to mid 12th century. This transmission did not rely on patriarchal lineage legitimacy but instead used the peculiar personalities and qualities of various folkloric figures to illustrate the Chan tradition's new commitment to the idea of "awakening" and the propagation of Chan to a larger congregation. The Chan Masters, Dahui Zonggao (1089–1163) and Hongzhi Zhengjue (1091–1157), were both leaders in the initial merging of local legend and Buddhist tradition.  They hoped the induction of likable and odd figures would attract all types of people to the Chan tradition, no matter their gender, social background, or complete understanding of the dharma and patriarchal lineage. Bernard Faure summarizes this merging of local legend and Chan tradition by explaining, "One strategy in Chan for domesticating the occult was to transform thaumaturges into tricksters by playing down their occult powers and stressing their thus world aspect..." The movement allocated the figures as religious props and channeled their extraordinary charismas into the lens of the Chan pantheon in order to appeal to a larger population. Ultimately, Budai was revered from both a folkloric standpoint as a strange, wandering vagabond of the people as well as from his newfound personage within the context of the Chan tradition as a 'mendicant priest' who brought abundance, fortune, and joy to all he encountered with the help of his mystical "cloth sack" bag.

In art
Budai is almost always depicted with his cloth sack that looks like a large bag. The bag serves as a prominent motif within the context of Chan Buddhism as it represents abundance, prosperity, and contentment. Ink paintings such as these attributed to Budai often had an inscription and seal that signaled to high-ranking officials. For example, Budai and Jiang Mohe was inscribed by Chusi Fanqi, who was closely related to Song Lian (1310–1381) and Wei Su (1295–1372).

After Chan Buddhism was transmitted to Japan around the 13th century as Zen Buddhism, the devout monastics and laymen of the area utilized figure painting to portray the characters central to this "awakening" period of Zen art. Many of the eccentric personalities that were inducted into the Zen tradition like Budai were previously wrapped up in the established culture and folklore of Japan. The assimilation and reapplication of these wondrous charismas to the Zen pantheon assisted in the expansion of the Zen tradition.

As the images demonstrate, Budai is most jubilant when in the presence of others, especially children. When depicted with other gods in the Seven Lucky Gods, Budai maintains a solemn or even depressed countenance. Budai's round figure comes into practical use through the sculpting of the incense box (18th century) that splits the monk's body into two halves. The newer images such as Hotei and Children Carrying Lanterns (19th century) employs much more color, dramatization of physical features, and detail than the older pieces such as Hotei from Mokuan Reien (1336) that employs much more wispy and heavily contrasting outlines of his figure with no color or assumed setting.

Japanese iconography, like that of Zen master Hakuin Ekaku, shows Budai in a multiplicity of representative actions, like entertaining passerbies, sheltering children under an umbrella and meditating using his sack as a cushion. In an especially known motif, Budai appears smoking in a kiseru and exhaling Otafuku, an ugly but charming prostitute that embodies Zen happiness, in a humorous reflection of the tradition according to which Shandao exhaled Amida, Kannon and Seishi with a prayer. The smooth lumpfish is known in Japan as hotei-uo ("Budai fish") due to its rotund appearance.

Sculpture

Paintings

Crafts

Confusion with other religious figures

Gautama Buddha

In the Western world, Budai is often mistaken for Gautama Buddha himself, and thus is nicknamed the "Fat Buddha".

Angida
Angida was one of the original Eighteen Arhats. According to legend, Angida was a talented Indian snake catcher whose aim was to catch venomous snakes to prevent them from biting passers-by. Angida would also remove the snake's venomous fangs and release them. Due to his kindness, he was able to attain bodhi.

In Chinese art, Angida is sometimes portrayed as Budai, being rotund, laughing, and carrying a bag.

Phra Sangkajai
In Thailand, Budai is sometimes confused with the arhat Kaccāna, known in Thailand as Phra Sangkajai or Phra Sangkachai. Buddha praised Phra Sangkajai for his excellence in explaining sophisticated concepts of the dhamma in an easily and correctly understandable manner. Phra Sangkajai is also known for composing the Madhupindika Sutta.

One story from Thai folklore relates that Phra Sangkajai was so handsome that even a man once wanted him for a wife. To avoid a similar situation, Phra Sangkajai decided to transform himself into a fat monk. Another tale says he was so attractive that angels and men often compared him with the Buddha. He considered this inappropriate, so disguised himself in an unpleasantly fat body.

Although both Budai and Phra Sangkajai may be found in both Thai and Chinese temples, Phra Sangkajai is found more often in Thai temples, and Budai in Chinese temples. Two points to distinguish them from one another are:
 Phra Sangkajai has a trace of hair on his head (looking similar to the Buddha's) while Budai is clearly bald.
 Phra Sangkajai wears the robes in Theravada fashion, with the robes folded across one shoulder, leaving the other uncovered. Budai wears the robes in Chinese style, covering both arms but leaving the front part of the upper body uncovered.

Kangxi Emperor
In Mongolia, Budai is called Enkh Amaglan Khan, which is identical to the Mongolian name for the Kangxi Emperor. Because of this, Budai is often mistaken for the Kangxi Emperor.

See also
 Buddha Shenrab

Notes

References

External links

 
 Who was Budai the "Happy Buddha"?, Golden Buddha
 Budai, Chinese Buddhist Encyclopedia

Bodhisattvas
Buddhas
Chinese gods
Fortune gods
Tang dynasty Buddhist monks
Wuyue Buddhist monks
Yiguandao
Maitreya
Buddhism in China
Legendary Chinese people
Deified Chinese people